Fujian Dali Group Co., Ltd. is a baked goods company in China. Its headquarters are in Hui'an County, Fujian, Quanzhou, China. The company incorporated in 1989. One of its food brands is Copico (Kěbǐkè).

 the company's annual sales were 7 billion yuan worth of product, equivalent to 700 million euros. In 2004 it began construction of a biscuit processing plant in Changchun, Jilin Province. The total budget for construction of the factory was 19 million euros, with the first phase of the project accounting for 11 million euros and the second phase, consisting of eight production lines, accounting for the remainder.

The chairman is the billionaire Xu Shihui.

In 2015, the company raised $1.3 billion from a public float on the Hong Kong Stock Exchange.

References

External links
 

Food and drink companies established in 1989
Food and drink companies of China
Companies based in Fujian
Quanzhou
Chinese companies established in 1989